Georg Spohr (born 24 January 1951) is a German rowing coxswain who competed for East Germany in the 1976 and in the 1980 Summer Olympics.

He was born in Magdeburg. In 1976 he was the coxswain of the East German boat that won the gold medal in the coxed pair event. Four years later he won his second gold medal when he again coxed the East German boat in the coxed pair competition.

References

1951 births
Living people
Sportspeople from Magdeburg
Coxswains (rowing)
Olympic rowers of East Germany
Rowers at the 1976 Summer Olympics
Rowers at the 1980 Summer Olympics
Olympic gold medalists for East Germany
Olympic medalists in rowing
East German male rowers
Medalists at the 1980 Summer Olympics
Medalists at the 1976 Summer Olympics
World Rowing Championships medalists for East Germany
Recipients of the Patriotic Order of Merit in silver